UMO Jazz Orchestra is a Finnish big band. It was founded in 1975 by jazz musicians Heikki Sarmanto and Esko Linnavalli. 

UMO is an abbreviation of "Uuden Musiikin Orkesteri" (New Musical Orchestra). Since 1984 UMO has been a professional orchestra which is financed by Finnish Broadcasting Company, Finnish Ministry of Education and Culture and the city of Helsinki. 

UMO has been toured in Europe, Canada, and the U.S. and has worked with Dexter Gordon, Dizzy Gillespie, Gil Evans, Mercer Ellington, McCoy Tyner, Maria Schneider, Michael Brecker, John Scofield, and Lenny Pickett.

Discography
 Our Latin Friends (1976)
 A Good Time Was Had By All (1976)
 Thad Jones, Mel Lewis & UMO (1978)
 Umophilos (1979)
 Sea Suite Effoa (1983)
 Ultima Thule (1983)
 Bad Luck, Good Luck (1985)
 UMO New Music Orchestra Plays the Music of Koivistoinen & Linkola (1985)
 Passions of a Man – Kalevala Fantasy (1987)
 Green & Yellow (1987)
 UMO Plays the Music of Muhal Richard Abrams (1989)
 The First Seven – UMO Plays BAT Jazz in Finland (1992)
 Live in Helsinki 1995 (1995)
 One More Time with Kenny Wheeler and Norma Winstone (2000)
 Transit People (2001)
 Counting on the Count – UMO Jazz Orchestra plays Count Basie (2004)
 Sauna palaa! (2005)
 Mister Blues with Pepe Ahlqvist (2006)
 The Sky Is Ruby with Raoul Björkenheim (2007)
 Agatha (UMO album)|Agatha with Kerkko Koskinen (2007)
 Taikapeitto with Satu Sopanen (2008)
 UMO on UMO (2009)
 Primal Mind – UMO Plays the Music of Raoul Björkenheim, Live in Helsinki 1991 (2010)
 Beauty and the Beast – UMO plays the music of Pekka Pohjola, Live & Studio 1977–2004 (2010)
 A Good Time Was Had By All 1976 – 1979 (2010)
 Rytmihyrrä – Eläinlauluja lapsille/Rytmyra – Djursånger för barn with Emma Salokoski (2011)
 Supermusic (with Nils Landgren & Viktoria Tolstoy, 2012)

External links 
UMO Jazz Orchestra Official Home Page

Big bands
Finnish jazz ensembles